KQSW (96.5 FM) is a country music formatted radio station broadcasting from Rock Springs, Wyoming, serving southwestern Wyoming. The station is owned by Big Thicket Broadcasting of Wyoming, who identifies themselves as WyoRadio, which includes local sister stations KSIT, KMRZ-FM, and KRKK.

Signal
Like its sister FM station KSIT, KQSW broadcasts from a tower on Aspen Mountain located south of Rock Springs. Although sister stations KQSW and KMRZ-FM are also on Aspen Mountain, the three stations use separate towers. KQSW can be heard throughout Sweetwater County, and in parts of northern Utah.

External links

QSW
Country radio stations in the United States
Sweetwater County, Wyoming
Radio stations established in 1976
1976 establishments in Wyoming